Pukaki was an 18th-century chief of the Arawa iwi of New Zealand.

His portrait appears on the New Zealand 20 cent coin minted from 1990 to 2008.

The name has been used for several New Zealand items:
Pukaki, one of the volcanic cones of the Auckland volcanic field
Lake Pukaki, a lake in Canterbury, New Zealand
Pukaki River, a river in Canterbury
HMNZS Pukaki, the name used by three ships of the Royal New Zealand Navy